Emmerson Nogueira – Beatles  is the fourth studio album by Brazilian Acoustic rock musician Emmerson Nogueira. It is a tribute to The Beatles, featuring 14 acoustic versions of famous songs composed by them.

Track listing
All tracks by Lennon/McCartney

Personnel 

Bruno Batista – art direction, A&R
Daniela Conolly – art supervisor
Marcos Falcao – guitar, lap steel guitar, soloist, bandolin
Vanessa Farias – vocals
Felipe Grillo – piano, vocals, cordas
Zé Mario – bateria
Sandro Mesquita – art supervisor
Marcelo Rizzo – executive producer

2004 albums
The Beatles tribute albums
Emmerson Nogueira albums